The 1940 United States presidential election in Utah took place on November 5, 1940 as part of the 1940 United States presidential election. All contemporary forty-eight states took part, and state voters selected four voters to the Electoral College, who voted for president and vice president.

Utah, like every other state west of the Continental Divide, voted for Franklin D. Roosevelt over Wendell Willkie by a substantial margin. This was the first time any Democrat won the state more than twice. Roosevelt landslided Utah with 62.25 percent of the vote. The percentage, however, wasn’t as large as his victory in the state four years earlier. , this is the last election in which Piute County voted for a Democratic presidential candidate.

Results

Results by county

See also
 United States presidential elections in Utah

References

1940 Utah elections
Utah
1940